Virbia flavifurca is a moth in the family Erebidae first described by George Hampson in 1916. It is found in Venezuela.

References

flavifurca
Moths described in 1916